無印良品 may refer to:
Michael & Victor, Malaysian Mandopop musical group
, Japanese retail chain